Bishwanath is an upazila of Sylhet District in the Division of Sylhet, Bangladesh.

History
One of the palaces of Gour Govinda, the last Hindu ruler of Sylhet, was situated in present-day Bishwanath. Its ruins are still intact and is locally referred to as 'Jahazer Manzil' and next to Govinda's personal pond, the 'Satpari Dighi'. During the Muslim conquest of Sylhet in 1303, Govinda abandoned Sylhet and fled to the Kamrup region. Shah Jalal, a leader of the conquest, was known to have dispatched his disciples across the region to propagate Islamic teachings. Among the disciples that arrived in present-day Bishwanath is Syed Batauk, the ancestor of Abdul Karim Kauria. Shah Chand was the son of Shaykh Kalu, another of Shah Jalal's disciples, and the village of Chandbharang was named after him. Shah Chand is the forefather of the Chowdhuries of Chandbharang, including Suheluddin Chowdhury and Shafiqur Rahaman Chowdhury.

After the defeat of Raja Subid Narayan of Ita by Khwaja Usman in the early 17th century, many Hindus migrated elsewhere including the area now comprising Bishwanath. Vijayaram Upadhayaya and his Kayastha student Bidhar Khan sailed with their family and friends through the Kapna river to this area (then a forest) for safety. The area was then home to a group of bandits led by Jula, but they were defeated by Bidhar Khan and his associates. The new settlers named the area 'Banabhag' (forest area), the area which he docked his boat came to be known as 'Bidhar Ghat' and the neighbourhood of the bandits came to be known as 'Jular Chiri'. When the Mughals came into power, they divided Banabhag into three parganas: Khalisa-Banabhag, Bazu-Banabhag and Kazakhabad. Bidhar Khan became the Zamindar of Bazu-Banabhag. His descendant, Ramnath Dhar, was a contemporary of Gopinath Bachaspati. Dhar's son, Babu Ramjivan Rai, was given the title of Chowdhury and granted land in Baurbhag by Inayetullah Khan, the Mughal administrator of Sylhet, in 1692. He was known to have been devoted to idol worship. His son, Bhavani Shankar, was the father of Zamindar Ram Shankar Chowdhury. Ram Shankar's son, Bishwanath Rai Chaudhury, established the 'Bishwanath Bazaar' which gradually expanded. His son, Brajanath Chaudhury, established an akhara for Chaitanya Mahaprabhu and was succeeded by Baikuntha Nath Chaudhury. Baikuntha Nath's son, Varada Nath Chaudhury, was a distinguished poet of Bishwanath.

Bishwanath was established as a thana in 1922. During the Bangladesh Liberation War of 1971, many Hindus were killed in Bishwanath including Jitendra Das, Dhirendra Kumar Das, Byomkesh Chaudhury, Narayan Sen and Basanta Kumar Das. Bishwanath Thana was upgraded to upazila (sub-district) in 1983 as part of the President of Bangladesh Hussain Muhammad Ershad's decentralisation programme.

Demographics
At the 1991 Bangladesh census, Bishwanath had a population of 169,730, of whom 83,794 were aged 18 or older. Males constituted 50.99% of the population, and females 49.01%. Bishwanath had an average literacy rate of 30.6% (7+ years), against the national average of 32.4%.

Education
The first alia madrasa of Bishwanath, Satpur Alia Madrasa in Lamakazi Union, was founded in 1948 by Ghulam Hussain, a native wali of Satpur and murid of Pir Hamidullah Qaimganji and Abdul Latif Chowdhury Fultali. In 1960, the Bishwanath Alia Madrasa was established. The largest qawmi madrasah of Bishwanath, Jamia Islamia Abbasia, was opened by Abdul Karim Shaykh-e-Kauria in 1955. There are 28 other madrasas in Bishwanath. They are: Jamia Islamia Darul Uloom Madania (founder, Ashraf Ali Bishwanathi), Jamia Islamia Miftahul Uloom (Ibrahit Ali, 1963), Munawwarul Uloom Islamia Madrasa (1992), Jamia Islamia Darul Uloom Lamakazi, Darul Quran Faiz-e-Aam Mirerchak, Jamia Islamia Darus Sunnah Amtail, Darul Uloom Chandbharang, Jamia Islamia Lutfabad-Patakain, Jamia Islam Darul Uloom Baruni, Madrasa-e-Tawakkulia Hafizia Sham-e-Mardan, Sheikhergaon Ibn Abbas Ibtidayi Madrasa, Haji Md Mafiz Ali Tahfizul Quran and Ibtidayi Madrasa, Darul Hikmah Islamic Academy, Jamia Madinatul Uloom Shimultala, Muqaddasia Islamia Hafizia Madrasa, Madinatul Uloom Sriramsri, Ariful Quran Hafizia Madrasa, Great Khurma Islamic Academy, Jamia Muhammadia Arabia, Jamia Tawakkulia Chowk Qasimpur, Jamia Islamia Hafizia Rampasha, Jamia Islamia Noagaon, Madinatul Uloom Nurani Hafizia Madrasa, Jamia Islamia Markazul Uloom Qadipur (Haji Shafiq Ali, 2016). Bishwanath also has three women's madrasas: Jamia Madania Qawmia Women's Madrasa, Jamia Tayyibah Qawmi Women's Madrasa (Anhar bin Saeed, 2018), Dhu al-Nuraryn Islamia Women's Madrasa (Amirul Islam, 2008).

Administration
Bishwanath Upazila is divided into eight union parishads: Alankari, Bishwanath, Doshghar, Daulatpur, Deokalas, Khajanchi, Lamakazi, and Rampasha. The union parishads are subdivided into 123 mauzas and 444 villages.

Notable people
 Jatindramohan Bhattacharya, academic and literary researcher
 Ashraf Ali Bishwanathi, Islamic scholar
 Nurul Islam Khan, Advocate and former MP for Sylhet-7
 Ilias Ali, former BNP MP for Sylhet-2
 Mokabbir Khan, current MP for Sylhet-2
 Muhammad Nurul Haque, cultural activist, social worker and writer
 Ragib Ali, industrialist, tea-planter, educationalist
 Rubel Ahmed, died in Morton Hall Immigration Removal Centre under controversial circumstances
 Rushanara Ali, British politician
 Shohid Ali, advocate
 Shafiqur Rahaman Chowdhury, Awami League politician
 Hason Raja, mystic poet, musician, philosopher

See also
Upazilas of Bangladesh
Districts of Bangladesh
Divisions of Bangladesh

References